
The Pastoral Greenhouse Gas Research Consortium (PGGRC) carries out research to find methods of reducing greenhouse gas emissions from livestock. The consortium, established in 2004, has a Memorandum of Understanding with the New Zealand Government. Almost half of the greenhouse gas emissions in New Zealand are due to agriculture and since the New Zealand government has signed and ratified the Kyoto Protocol methods are being sought to seek a reduction of these emissions.

In 2003 the Government attempted to impose an Agricultural emissions research levy on farmers to fund research into agricultural emissions reduction but it proved to be unpopular and the proposal was abandoned. The PGGRC is an alternative method of addressing agricultural emissions.

An independent review in 2006 found that the PGGRC was producing world-leading research and is excellent value for money.

Partners
The partners in the consortium are:
AgResearch
Fonterra
Fert Research
PGG Wrightson
DairyNZ
Deer Research
Meat & Wool New Zealand

Associate members are the Ministry of Agriculture and Forestry, NIWA and Foundation for Research, Science and Technology. Research is carried out by AgResearch, DairyNZ, LIC and Lincoln University.

See also
Agriculture in New Zealand
Climate change in New Zealand
Environment of New Zealand

References

External links
Pastoral Greenhouse Gas Research Consortium

Climate change in New Zealand
Agricultural organisations based in New Zealand
2004 establishments in New Zealand